Asaccharobacter celatus  is a Gram-positive, non-spore-forming and obligately anaerobic bacterium from the genus of Asaccharobacter which has been isolated from a rat caecum in Japan. Asaccharobacter celatus produces equol and 5-hydroxy equol.

In 2018, the genus Asaccharobacter was transferred into the genus Aldercreutzia based on branching patterns observed in phylogenetic trees. The correct nomenclature is Adlercreutzia equolifaciens subsp. celatus.

References

Further reading

External links
Type strain of Asaccharobacter celatus at BacDive -  the Bacterial Diversity Metadatabase	

Actinomycetota
Bacteria described in 2008